Laurette Ngoma Laperle (born February 2, 1989), known professionally as Laurette la Perle is a Congolese singer songwriter, model and business woman from Democratic Republic of the Congo.

Biography and career 
At the age of 8 she started to attend the classical parish of her neighborhood, the practice in the choir allowed her to participate in certain shows, parties and competitions. In 2000 she was selected among the best singers of her city. She was born to a mother who was a nurse and father who was a doctor who already died.

Awards and nominations 

 2015: MTV Africa awards for the best francophone.
 2016: Afrima Awards for best female from central Africa.

Discography

Albums 

 2015: Love story
 2018: Love net

Singles 

Gigolo
Siska
Terminus
Love story
Sur mesure
Follow me

See also 

 Fally Ipupa
 Koffi Olomide
 Ferre Gola

Collaboration 

 "Venus" (Single 2015) ft Bana C4
 "Chaise Électrique (Remix) ft Fally Ipupa
 Tribute to Koffi Olomide and Ferre Gola

References

External links 
 Laurette on YouTube
 Laurette la Perle Skyrock Music Blog

1989 births
Living people
People from Kinshasa
21st-century Democratic Republic of the Congo women singers
Democratic Republic of the Congo songwriters
21st-century Democratic Republic of the Congo people